Kachurwahi is a Gram Panchayat village in Ramtek Tehsil of Nagpur district, India. It is situated in the South East of Ramtek at the distance of 10 km from Ramtek.

The village has a post office and a branch of State Bank of India.  It has a primary school and two high schools.

References

Villages in Nagpur district